Ross Highway is a road in the Northern Territory of Australia located to the south of Alice Springs.

From west to east, it provides vehicular access to Yeperenye /Emily and Jessie Gaps Nature Park, the community of Amoonguna, Corroboree Rock Conservation Reserve, Trephina Gorge Nature Park, Ross River Resort, N'Dhala Gorge Nature Park and Arltunga Historical Reserve.

The highway is sealed from the Stuart Highway to Ross River and is unsealed for the remainder of its length.  It is maintained by the Northern Territory government.

The highway was named in 1987 after John Ross, an explorer of Central Australia, whose name has also been given to Ross River. Part of the highway is an existing road which was previously  named as Emily Gap Road.

Major intersections

The only major intersection on this road is with the Stuart Highway (National Route 87) in the Alice Springs suburb of Ross.

See also

 Highways in Australia
 List of highways in the Northern Territory

References

Highways in the Northern Territory